Norbert Nussbaum is an architectural historian specialising in the Gothic who is a professor at the Kunsthistorisches Institut, University of Cologne.

Selected publications

English
German Gothic church architecture. Yale University Press, New Haven, 2000.

German
Deutsche kirchenbaukunst der Gotik. Wissenschaftliche Buchgesellschaft, 1994. 
Das gotische Gewolbe: Eine Geschichte seiner form und konstruktion. Deutscher Kunstverlag, 1999.

References

Living people
Year of birth missing (living people)
Academic staff of the University of Cologne
German architectural historians